The Main road 34 is a northeast-southwest direction Secondary class main road in the Nagykunság (Alföld) region of Hungary that connects the Main road 33 to the Main road 4 and 406, facilitating access from Tiszafüred to Fegyvernek-Szapárfalu. The road is 55 km long.

The road, as well as all other main roads in Hungary, is managed and maintained by Magyar Közút, state owned company.

Sources

See also

 Roads in Hungary
 Transport in Hungary

External links

 Hungarian Public Road Non-Profit Ltd. (Magyar Közút Nonprofit Zrt.)
 National Infrastructure Developer Ltd.

Main roads in Hungary
Transport in Jász-Nagykun-Szolnok County